The Poker Club was one of several clubs at the heart of the Scottish Enlightenment where many associated with that movement met and exchanged views in a convivial atmosphere.

History
The Poker Club was created in 1762 out of the ashes of The Select Society.

The Poker was the name given to the Militia Club at its third or fourth meeting. The Militia was formed in Edinburgh to promote the cause of establishing a militia in Scotland. It was thought that the formation of a democratic national force was essential to grace the dignity of the nation and the aim was to make up for the omission of that provision in the Militia Act of 1757 which applied only to England and the Scottish Militia Bill which was rejected in April 1760. The aim of the club provoked some unwelcome opposition and, at the suggestion of Adam Smith the name was changed so as to be enigmatic to the general public. Much as a fireplace poker stirs a fire to flame up, The Poker was to "stir up" the militia question.

David Hume could well find the company of The Poker a relief from a 
skeptical depression –  "Most fortunately it happens that since reason is incapable of dispelling these clouds, nature herself suffices to that purpose ... I dine, I play a game of backgammon, I converse, and am merry with my friends; and when after three or four hours amusement, I return to these speculations, they appear so cold, and strain'd, and ridiculous, that I cannot find it in my heart to enter into them any farther."

As to why the club collapsed, Adam Smith said, "Divided counsels and diminished zeal supply, no doubt, the main reason for the decay of the Poker Club," but he also mentioned the rising costs to members.

Membership

The club was said by Dr Carlyle to consist of all the literati of Edinburgh and its surroundings. The establishment was frugal and moderate, "as that for all clubs for a public purpose should be. The dinner was set soon after two o'clock, at one shilling a head, the wine to be confined to sherry and claret, and the reckoning to be called at six o’clock".

The first fifteen members were chosen by nomination, the rest by ballot, "two black balls to exclude the candidate". A new "preses" (chairman) was chosen at each meeting. There were three office bearers: the Secretary, Sir William Pulteney, the Assassin, Andrew Crosbie and the Assassin’s Assessor, David Hume "without whose assent nothing could be done, so that between "plus" and "minus" there was likely to be no bloodshed".

The minute book of 1776 names forty three members, including Joseph Black, "Jupiter" Carlyle, Sir John Clerk of Eldin, Henry Dundas, Adam Ferguson, Lord Elibank, Sir John Dalrymple, John Hume, David Hume, William Robertson, John Robison, George Dempster, and Adam Smith.

See also
 Edinburgh Cape Club
 Crochallan Fencibles

References

, p. 312. quoted in –
Daiches D., Jones P., Jones J. (eds ) The Scottish Enlightenment: 1730 - 1790 A Hotbed of Genius The University of Edinburgh, 1986.

Scottish Enlightenment
Political advocacy groups in Scotland
Gentlemen's clubs in Scotland
Defunct organisations based in Scotland
Military of Scotland
Organisations based in Edinburgh
Clubs and societies in Edinburgh